This article shows all participating team squads at the 2009 Men's European Volleyball Championship, held in Turkey from 3 to 13 September 2009.

The following is the Bulgarian roster in the 2009 Men's European Volleyball Championship.

The following is the Czech roster in the 2009 Men's European Volleyball Championship.

The following is the Estonian roster in the 2009 Men's European Volleyball Championship.

The following is the Finnish roster in the 2009 Men's European Volleyball Championship.

The following is the French roster in the 2009 Men's European Volleyball Championship.

The following is the Greek roster in the 2009 Men's European Volleyball Championship.

The following is the Spanish roster in the 2009 Men's European Volleyball Championship.

The following is the Dutch roster in the 2009 Men's European Volleyball Championship.

The following is the German roster in the 2009 Men's European Volleyball Championship.

The following is the Italian roster in the 2009 Men's European Volleyball Championship.

The following is the Polish roster in the 2009 Men's European Volleyball Championship.

The following is the Russian roster in the 2009 Men's European Volleyball Championship.

The following is the Serbian roster in the 2009 Men's European Volleyball Championship.

The following is the Slovak roster in the 2009 Men's European Volleyball Championship.

The following is the Slovenian roster in the 2009 Men's European Volleyball Championship.

The following is the Turkish roster in the 2009 Men's European Volleyball Championship.

References

S
E
2009 in volleyball